Cathie Taylor (born July 26, 1944) is a Canadian-born actress and singer of country music and later gospel who had some success in the 1960s.

Biography
Cathie Taylor was born in Winnipeg, Manitoba, and while a child moved with her family to Morgan Hill, California. At age 12, a talent contest appearance led to her singing Western folk songs on San Francisco's KQED-TV. After some time raising blue-ribbon cows, she landed her own radio show on KPER in Gilroy, California. Word of her talent spread to Country & Western impresario Cliffie Stone, who invited her to Los Angeles, and guided her early career.

Taylor went on to appear on The Breakfast Club, The Tennessee Ernie Ford Show, The Lawrence Welk Show, Five Star Jubilee, The Roy Rogers and Dale Evans Show (1962), and Alfred Hitchcock's Presents.

She appeared in the 1963 film Hootenanny Hoot, sang on Shindig! (September 1, 1965), and won awards from the Academy of Country Music in 1966 (Most Promising Female Vocalist) and 1968 (Best Female Vocalist). In the 70s she turned to gospel music, singing on The 700 Club on the Christian Broadcasting Network cable network. In 2010 Taylor was performing church concerts and released a new CD, Praising My Savior.

References

External links

1944 births
Living people
American country singer-songwriters
American women country singers
Capitol Records artists
Musicians from Winnipeg
21st-century American women